Maiocercus celticus is a species of early trigonotarbid arachnid from the Upper Carboniferous of Westhoughton, Lancashire, UK. The species was first described in 1902, with a "new species" being described in 1911 (M. orbicularis) which has been proven as being a junior synonym of M. celticus.

M. celticus is the type species of the genus Maiocercus.

Originally zoologist Reginald Innes Pocock compared M. celticus to Brachypyge, with later evidence showing that Brachypyge had "opisthosoma which were much longer than wide; with the pleural laminæ of the second and third pleura-bearing terga being inclined slightly backwards" (Brachypyge) with Maiocercus having the “opisthosoma much wider than long; the pleural laminæ of the first, second, third, and fourth sterna being inclined slightly forwards”.

The original drawing which showed Maiocercus described a pitting on the underside of the slightly forwarded laminæ, with a non-uniform concavity on the outer margins of them. The concavity is most well-marked in the fifth, sixth, seventh and eighth somites, with the opposite happening on the second, third and fourth somites.

See also

 Trigonotarbida

 Anthracomartidae

References

Trigonotarbids
Carboniferous arachnids
Carboniferous arthropods of Europe
Arthropods
Paleozoic arachnids